VideoKids were a 1980s Euro disco/Italo disco duo from the Netherlands, formed in 1984 and consisting of Peter Slaghuis (1961-1991) and Bianca Bonelli (1963-1995). The band's members also had solo careers on their own, such as Peter being a famous disc jockey and remixer, and Bianca having a solo single called "Je Veux L'amour (Follow Me)". They released two albums, The Invasion of the Spacepeckers in 1984 and On Satellite in 1985. All of their songs were produced and written by Catapult musicians Aart Mol, Cees Bergman, Elmer Veerhoff, Erwin van Prehn and Geertjan Hessing (under the aliases "Adams & Fleisner" and "Tony Acardi"), and recorded at Cat Music. Bergman did the male vocals, while the female vocals were done by Sylvia and Anita Crooks of the vocal trio The Internationals. 

The most notable aspect of the band is the fact that they were very popular yet short-lived. They also had an animated mascot named Tico Tac (designed by Dirk Arend, and animated by Bjørn Frank Jensen and coloured by Frits Godhelp at Toonder Studio's), a "spacepecker" who wore a yellow space suit and white space helmet, and had a wood drill on his back side functioning like an insect stinger. He also had the same laugh as Woody Woodpecker as his trademark. Tico was featured in the band's music videos for "Woodpeckers from Space" and "Do the Rap" along with the real band members, so for that reason they were almost considered a virtual group. In 1985, The Invasion of the Spacepeckers was released at the Midem music festival, and went on to sell 1.1 million copies.  VideoKids received the Buma Export Award for their international success with the album and "Woodpeckers from Space".  On Satellite (also released at the Midem music festival in 1986) and the band's other singles ("Do the Rap", "Satellite" and "Witch Doctor"), however, were unsuccessful.

The songs "La Bamba" (from their album, The Invasion of the Spacepeckers), "Tico Tac" (from their album, On Satellite) and "Witch Doctor" were the only cover versions they did, originally by Ritchie Valens, the Belgian synthpop group Polysix and Ross Bagdasarian, respectively. The song "Woodpeckers from Space" has been covered and remixed several times throughout history, such as a version by South African band Café Society in 1985, a cover by Doctor Pecker in 1986, a cover by The Smurfs in 1995, a cover by V-Kid in 1999, a remix by Evelyn in 2001, a cover by Spritney Bears in 2003, and a posthumous remake in 2007, and was featured in the Pingu episode, "Pingu Helps with Incubating", although it has been replaced by David Hasselhoff's "Pingu-Dance" in its newer version.

Slaghuis died in a car accident on September 5, 1991, Bonelli died of lung cancer in 1995, and their music has not had any sales since 1988.

Discography

Albums
The Invasion of the Spacepeckers (1984)
On Satellite (1985)

Singles
"Woodpeckers from Space" (1984)
"Do the Rap" (1985)
"Satellite" (1985)
"Witch Doctor" (1988)

References

External links
Media Club profile

Dutch dance music groups
Musical groups established in 1984
Eurodisco groups
Dutch musical duos
Male–female musical duos